Artem Honcharenko (born March 21, 1979) is a Ukrainian former swimmer, who specialized in freestyle and in individual medley events. Honcharenko competed in three swimming events at the 2000 Summer Olympics in Sydney. He eclipsed a FINA B-cut of 2:04.30 (200 m individual medley) from the Belarus Championships in Minsk. On the first day of the Games, Honcharenko teamed up with Vyacheslav Shyrshov, Pavlo Khnykin, and the late Rostyslav Svanidze in the 4×100 m freestyle relay. Honcharenko swam the third leg in heat three and recorded a split of 49.98, but the Ukrainians settled only for fourth place and twelfth overall with a final time of 3:21.48. Three days later, Honcharenko, along with Svanidze, Ihor Snitko, and Serhiy Fesenko, placed fourteenth in the 4×200 m freestyle relay with a time of 7:32.16. In his final event, 200 m individual medley, Honcharenko placed thirty-first on the morning prelims. Swimming in heat four, he pulled off a fifth-place effort with a much faster freestyle leg in 2:05.98, a 1.68-second deficit off his entry time.

References

1979 births
Living people
Ukrainian male swimmers
Olympic swimmers of Ukraine
Swimmers at the 2000 Summer Olympics
Ukrainian male freestyle swimmers
Male medley swimmers
Sportspeople from Kharkiv
21st-century Ukrainian people